Tanaica is a genus of tephritid  or fruit flies in the family Tephritidae.

Species
Tanaica hyalipennis (Bezzi, 1924)
Tanaica maculata Merz & Dawah, 2005
Tanaica pollinosa Merz & Dawah, 2005

References

Tephritinae
Tephritidae genera
Diptera of Africa
Diptera of Asia